Open All Night is a 1924 American silent comedy film produced by Famous Players-Lasky and released by Paramount Pictures. Paul Bern, better known as a writer and later husband of Jean Harlow, directed and Viola Dana, Jetta Goudal, and Raymond Griffith starred. The screenplay is based on Paul Morand's 1922 short story collection Open All Night. Actors Viola Dana and "Lefty" Flynn would soon marry after this film.

Cast

Preservation
Open All Night is an extant film at the Library of Congress, UCLA Film and Television Archive, George Eastman House Motion Picture Collection, and Cineteca Del Friuli.

References

External links

Open All Night at Odysee

1924 films
American silent feature films
Famous Players-Lasky films
Films based on short fiction
Films based on works by Paul Morand
Paramount Pictures films
1924 comedy films
Silent American comedy films
American black-and-white films
1920s American films